Richard L. Morton (born February 2, 1966) is an American former professional basketball player played briefly in the National Basketball Association (NBA). Born in San Francisco, California, he was a 6'3"  point guard, and played college basketball at California State University, Fullerton and later played for the NBA's Indiana Pacers.

Morton played two games with the Pacers during the 1988–89 NBA season, registering six total points on 3-of-4 shooting.  He spent several seasons in the Continental Basketball Association, playing for the Topeka Sizzlers, Rochester Flyers, San Jose Jammers, Albany Patroons, Rapid City Thrillers, Tri-City Chinook and Quad City Thunder from 1988 to 1994.  He averaged 18.7 points and 4.1 rebounds per game for his career and was a CBA All-Star in 1990 and 1991.

Until February 2006, Morton was the head coach of the ABA's now-defunct San Francisco Pilots.

References

External links
NBA stats @ basketball-reference.com

1966 births
Living people
Albany Patroons players
American expatriate basketball people in the Philippines
American men's basketball coaches
American men's basketball players
Basketball coaches from California
Basketball players from San Francisco
Cal State Fullerton Titans men's basketball players
Indiana Pacers players
Philippine Basketball Association imports
Point guards
Quad City Thunder players
Rochester Flyers players
San Jose Jammers players
San Miguel Beermen players
Shooting guards
Topeka Sizzlers players
Tri-City Chinook players
Undrafted National Basketball Association players